is the northernmost point of the island of Hokkaidō, Japan and by extension the whole of Japan. It is situated in Wakkanai, Sōya Subprefecture.

There are more than ten monuments at Cape Sōya, including the Monument of the northernmost Point of Japan, the Tower of Prayer (a memorial to Korean Air Lines Flight 007, shot down in 1983), a statue of Mamiya Rinzō, the Monument of Peace (a memorial to the sunken submarine , and others). Sōya Misaki settlement, east of the cape, has many facilities known to be "the northernmost in Japan", such as the northernmost lighthouse (Cape Sōya Lighthouse), the northernmost filling station (Idemitsu Cape Sōya SS), the northernmost elementary school (Ōmisaki Elementary School), and so on.

Monument of Peace

The inscription on the memorial reads in part:

The exact position of Wahoo was confirmed by a dive team from the Sakhalin Energy Investment Company Ltd in July 2006.

Tower of Prayer
Cape Sōya is the location of another memorial, the Tower of Prayer. The monument, which is 19.83 metres tall and constructed from granite, stands in remembrance of the 269 people that were killed during Korean Air Lines Flight 007 on 1 September 1983. In the incident, the aircraft operating the flight was shot down by a Soviet Air Forces Sukhoi Su-15 interceptor near Moneron Island, roughly 98 kilometres to the north of the cape.

Climate

See also
 Extreme points of Japan

References

Gallery

Soya
Extreme points of Japan
Landforms of Hokkaido
Tourist attractions in Hokkaido